Jan "John" van Alphen (17 June 1914 – 19 December 1961) was a Belgian footballer, born in Antwerp, Belgium.

He played as a midfielder for Beerschot VAC. With the anversois, he twice won the Belgian Championship, in 1938 and 1939. He played for the Diables Rouges from 1938 to 1944, with whom he played eleven games, including one at the 1938 World Cup.

Honours 
 International from 1938 to 1944 (11 caps)
 First international match: Belgium-Netherlands, 1-1, 3 April 1938
 Participation in the 1938 World Cup (Played one match)
 Belgian Champion in 1938 and 1939 with Beerschot VAC
 Belgian Vice-Champion in 1937 with Beerschot VAC

References

External links 

Belgium international footballers
Belgian footballers
1938 FIFA World Cup players
K. Beerschot V.A.C. players
Belgian football managers
K.S.V. Waregem managers
1914 births
1961 deaths
Footballers from Antwerp
Association football midfielders
Association football defenders